Luís Filipe Silva Fernandes (born 2 December 1987) is a Portuguese cyclist, who currently rides for UCI Continental team .

Major results

2013
 3rd Subida à Glória
2015
 1st Circuit de Malveira
2018
 1st Circuit de Póvoa da Galega
2020
 5th Overall Troféu Joaquim Agostinho
2021
 1st  Mountains classification, Volta ao Algarve

References

External links
 

1987 births
Living people
Portuguese male cyclists
Sportspeople from Lisbon